Monique van de Ree (born 2 March 1988) is a Dutch former road cyclist, who rode professionally between 2007 and 2019 for eight different teams.

Major results

2009
 4th Omloop der Kempen
 10th Omloop Het Nieuwsblad
 10th Rund um die Nürnberger Altstadt
2010
 6th Grand Prix de Dottignies
 9th Overall Ladies Tour of Qatar
 10th Drentse 8 van Dwingeloo
2011
 10th Overall Energiewacht Tour
2013
 4th Knokke-Heist – Bredene
 9th Erondegemse Pijl
2015
 1st Parel van de Veluwe
 2nd Omloop van de IJsseldelta
 5th Ronde van Overijssel
 7th Trofee Maarten Wynants
 10th EPZ Omloop van Borsele
 10th Diamond Tour
2016
 3rd Diamond Tour
 4th Trofee Maarten Wynants
 4th Erondegemse Pijl
 6th Omloop van de IJsseldelta
 7th Madrid Challenge by La Vuelta
 9th 7-Dorpenomloop Aalburg
2017
 2nd Diamond Tour
 6th Erondegemse Pijl
 7th Omloop van Borsele
 7th Gooik–Geraardsbergen–Gooik
2018
 2nd Trofee Maarten Wynants
 3rd Erondegemse Pijl
 4th 7-Dorpenomloop Aalburg
 4th Omloop van de IJsseldelta
 9th Brabantse Pijl Dames Gooik
 10th Flanders Ladies Classic
2019
 1st Erondegemse Pijl
 6th Diamond Tour

See also
2007 Vrienden van het Platteland season
2011 AA Drink–leontien.nl season
2014 Parkhotel Valkenburg Continental Team season

References

External links

1988 births
Dutch female cyclists
Living people
People from Moerdijk
Cyclists from North Brabant
21st-century Dutch women